Leonard N. Smith (born October 4, 1961 – February 20, 2022) was the senior pastor of Mount Zion Baptist Church in Arlington, Virginia, with a congregation exceeding 2,000. Mount Zion Baptist Church, founded in 1866, is the oldest Black congregation in Arlington, Virginia.

Biography 
Smith was born in Baltimore, Maryland, and raised partly in Washington, D.C. His grandmother provided a strong influence for his religious upbringing. He has a doctorate of ministry in preaching from United Theological Seminary in Dayton, Ohio, as well as eight honorary degrees. He has two adult children.

Ministry  

Smith began ministry in 1985 as pastor of Union Baptist Church in Gordonsville, Virginia. During his tenure there as the fifth pastor, a Mass Choir was started, a church parsonage  purchased, and church renovations started and completed. Four years later, he was called to Rivermont Baptist Church in Lynchburg, Virginia.

In 1991, Smith became senior pastor at Mount Zion Baptist Church in Arlington, Virginia. The church was founded just after the Civil War in 1866 as the Old Bell Church and located in the free black settlement of Freedman's Village, now the site of Arlington National Cemetery. The current location is in the established community of Nauck.

He served as a chaplain for both the Arlington County Fire and Police Departments. The Arlington County Fire Department was one of the primary responding agencies to the 9/11 attack on the Pentagon. As fire department chaplain, Smith was among the first on the scene after the tragedy and provided spiritual support to responders.

Smith was former president (2009–2012) of the Virginia Baptist State Convention (VBSC), which was organized in 1867 and counts about 700 member churches. VBSC is affiliated with the National Baptist Convention, USA, Inc.  He was also a past president of Richmond Virginia Seminary, having served from 2005 to 2008.

Books 
 We Need to Talk: Saying What We Need to Say Without Hurting Each Other. Foreword by Audrey B. Chapman (2012)   
 Seen and Sustained: Increase the Visibility and Income of the Local Church. Co-author with Akia T. Garnett. (2010)

External references

 Mount Zion Baptist Church, Arlington, VA Official Website

References

1961 births
2022 deaths
African-American Baptist ministers
Baptist ministers from the United States
Baptists from Virginia
21st-century African-American people
20th-century African-American people